The 2009 Upper Austrian state election was held on 27 September 2009 to elect the members of the Landtag of Upper Austria.

The Austrian People's Party (ÖVP) made gains but fell just short of an overall majority. The Social Democratic Party of Austria (SPÖ) suffered major losses, falling to just under a quarter of the vote, while the Freedom Party of Austria (FPÖ) recovered some of the losses they had taken in the 2003 election. The ÖVP under Governor Josef Pühringer subsequently renewed its working agreement with the Greens which had been signed after the previous election.

Background
The Upper Austrian constitution mandates that cabinet positions in the state government (state councillors) be allocated between parties proportionally in accordance with the share of votes won by each; this is known as Proporz. As such, the government is a perpetual coalition of all parties that qualify for at least one state councillor. Despite this, parties still establish formal coalitions to organise cabinet positions and ensure a Landtag majority for legislative purposes.

In the 2003 state election, the ÖVP maintained a small lead over the SPÖ, which achieved a strong swing in its favour while the FPÖ's support collapsed. The Greens achieved a respectable result of 9%, and crucially achieved balance of power in the state government. The ÖVP and SPÖ each won four councillors, while the Greens won one; the FPÖ failed to win any. The ÖVP signed a working coalition with the Greens, giving rise to the first ÖVP–Green government in Austria.

Electoral system
The 56 seats of the Landtag of Upper Austria are elected via open list proportional representation in a two-step process. The seats are distributed between five multi-member constituencies. For parties to receive any representation in the Landtag, they must either win at least one seat in a constituency directly, or clear a 4 percent state-wide electoral threshold. Seats are distributed in constituencies according to the Hare quota, with any remaining seats allocated using the D'Hondt method at the state level, to ensure overall proportionality between a party's vote share and its share of seats.

Contesting parties
The table below lists parties represented in the previous Landtag.

In addition to the parties already represented in the Landtag, three parties collected enough signatures to be placed on the ballot.

 Alliance for the Future of Austria (BZÖ)
 Communist Party of Austria (KPÖ)
 The Christians (DC)

Results

Results by constituency

References

2009 elections in Austria
State elections in Austria
September 2009 events in Europe
Upper Austria